Sofía Montserrat Aragón Torres (born 13 February 1994) is a Mexican model, television presenter, author, and beauty pageant titleholder who was crowned Mexicana Universal 2019. She represented Mexico at the Miss Universe 2019 competition, where she placed as the second runner-up.

Personal life
Aragón was born on 13 February 1994 in Guadalajara, Jalisco. Aragón later lived in the city of Zapopan, located within the Guadalajara metropolitan area. 

In the past, Aragón struggled with depression and had contemplated suicide. She has since become an advocate for mental health awareness and suicide prevention, working with the organization Sonrisas Reales as a public speaker and writer.

Pageantry
Aragón entered pageantry after competing to become the representative from Jalisco at the Miss Mexico Organization pageant in 2017. Lezly Díaz won, with Aragón as second runner up.

A year later she competed for the title of Mexicana Universal Jalisco, aiming to represent her state at Mexicana Universal 2019. She was not selected and Dorothy Sutherland became the representative instead. After Sutherland came in breach of her contract for not appearing at required events, she was replaced by Aragón as Mexicana Universal Jalisco 2018.

Days after her appointment, Aragón competed in the Mexicana Universal 2019 competition in Mexico City. She was selected as one of the top twenty finalists following the first round on 16 June, and entered the top ten prior to the final held on 23 June. During the 23 June airing, Aragón was crowned Mexicana Universal by outgoing titleholder Andrea Toscano, besting first runner-up Claudia Lozano Domínguez of Nuevo León. She represented Mexico at Miss Universe 2019, where she placed as the second runner-up, the  highest placement for Mexico since Ximena Navarrete, who won Miss Universe 2010.

Filmography

Television

References

External links

  (Dethroned)

1994 births
21st-century Mexican women writers
Living people
Mexican beauty pageant winners
Mexicana Universal winners
Miss Universe 2019 contestants
People from Zapopan, Jalisco
Universidad Autónoma de Guadalajara alumni
Writers from Guadalajara, Jalisco